Stone Gate is a landmark of the Upper Town of Zagreb. It was built between 1242 and 1266 and got its present look in the 18th century.

References

Buildings and structures in Zagreb
Gornji Grad–Medveščak